Impactor may refer to:
 A large meteoroid, asteroid, comet, or other celestial object which causes an impact event
 Impactor (Transformers), a fictional character
 Impactor (spacecraft), a craft designed for high-velocity landing
 Impact wrench, a power tool